RAF Hospital Uxbridge was a military hospital within the Royal Air Force station RAF Uxbridge.

History
Douglas Bader arrived at the hospital in 1932 to recover after the amputation of both of his legs following a flying accident. It was during his stay that he met the Desoutter brothers who were pioneering the use of lightweight aluminium for the production of prosthetic limbs. Bader was fitted with the new style of legs and returned to active service with the RAF, to become known as "the legless pilot".

In early 1940, the officers' hospital on the station became the Women's Auxiliary Air Force Hospital, with the Officers' hospital moving to the RAF Hospital Torquay.

References
Citations

Bibliography
 Crozier, Hazel. (2007) RAF Uxbridge 90th Anniversary 1917–2007. RAF High Wycombe: Air Command Media Services

Buildings and structures in the London Borough of Hillingdon
Uxbridge
Military hospitals in the United Kingdom
Military history of Middlesex
Defunct hospitals in London
Health in the London Borough of Hillingdon
Royal Air Force Medical Services